Martin Site may refer to:

 Martin Site, one of the National Register of Historic Places listings in Powell County, Kentucky
 Martin Site (Fosters Falls, Virginia)